Percy Whitman Knapp (February 24, 1909 – June 14, 2004) was a United States district judge of the United States District Court for the Southern District of New York. Previous to that service, he led a far-reaching investigation into corruption in the New York City Police Department from 1970 to 1972.

Early life and education

Born on February 24, 1909, in New York City, New York, Knapp was the son of Wallace Percy Knapp, a wealthy lawyer in New York. His mother was killed in a horse riding accident in Central Park when he was only three years old. He attended The Browning School, graduating in 1927, The Choate School (now Choate Rosemary Hall), graduating in 1927, and Yale University, graduating in 1931 with a Bachelor of Arts degree. He went on to Harvard Law School, where he was editor of the Harvard Law Review, graduating in 1934 with a Bachelor of Laws. He married Elizabeth Mercer shortly after graduation.

Legal career

After his graduation from law school, he started working with the law firm of Cadwalader, Wickersham & Taft in Manhattan. He remained there until 1937, when he left to become an Assistant District Attorney in Manhattan under the newly elected racket-busting District Attorney Thomas E. Dewey. In 1941, Knapp returned to private life and joined the law firm of Donovan, Leisure, Newton & Lumbard. Within a year Frank S. Hogan, Manhattan's new District Attorney, persuaded him to return to public service and he served as an assistant district attorney of the Indictments and Frauds Division, from 1942 to 1944, and as an assistant district attorney of the Appellate Division, from 1944 to 1950. In 1950, Knapp left Mr. Hogan's office to again enter private practice until his appointment to the federal bench in 1972. Concurrent with his private practice, he served as a special counsel to Dewey, who had become governor of New York State, and was a member of the commission that revised the state's criminal code. Knapp served during 1953 to 1954 as special counsel to the Waterfront Commission of New York Harbor, which looked into corruption on the waterfront.

Knapp Commission

In 1970, Mayor John V. Lindsay appointed Knapp to head a five-member commission investigating corruption in the New York City Police Department later known as the Knapp Commission. The probe was sparked by revelations from two police officers, Patrolman Frank Serpico, and Sergeant David Durk. Looking back on the work of the Knapp Commission, Knapp said that the relatively few convictions did not matter as much as his work did, for he felt his work had changed the culture of the police so that they took the charge of corruption in their midst more seriously.

Federal judicial service

Knapp was nominated by President Richard Nixon on June 15, 1972, to a seat on the United States District Court for the Southern District of New York vacated by Judge Walter R. Mansfield. He was confirmed by the United States Senate on June 28, 1972, and received his commission on June 30, 1972. He assumed senior status on November 23, 1987. His service was terminated on June 14, 2004, due to his death in New York City.

Notable cases

In 1986, Knapp presided over the racketeering case against Bronx County Democratic leader Stanley M. Friedman. In 1993, Knapp joined with Judge Jack B. Weinstein of the United States District Court for the Eastern District of New York, based in Brooklyn, New York, in declaring that they would no longer preside over drug trials.

Death

On June 14, 2004, Knapp died at the age of 95 at the Cabrini Hospice in Manhattan. He served on the bench up until his death. He was survived by his third wife, Ann Fallert Knapp, a son, Gregory Wallace Knapp, and by three children from his first wife, Elizabeth Mercer Nason; a son, Whitman E. Knapp, and two daughters, Caroline Hines and Marion Knapp; five grandchildren and five great-grandchildren.

See also
 Thomas E. Dewey
 Frank S. Hogan
 John V. Lindsay
 Knapp Commission
 Mollen Commission
 Police corruption
 Police misconduct
 Frank Serpico
 Serpico

References

Further reading
 MRS. MARROW WED TO WHITMAN KNAPP – New York Times article: November 4, 1956
 MRS. KNAPP WED TO JOHN W. NASON; Former Elizabeth Mercer and Ex-Swarthmore Head Marry at Keene Valley – New York Times article: June 30, 1957
 Graft Paid to Police Here Said to Run Into Millions; Survey Links Payoffs to Gambling and Narcotics Some on Force Accuse Officials of Failure to Act Graft Payments to Policemen Here Are Reported to Run Into the Millions Annually Some Members of Force Say Officials Fail to Act – New York Times article: April 25, 1970
 Mayor's Committee Investigating Police Corruption Here Meets Tomorrow to Determine Procedures – New York Times article: April 26, 1970
 PANEL ON POLICE MAY BE REPLACED; Mayor Is Expected to Name a Larger Unit on Graft That Excludes Leary – New York Times article: May 9, 1970
 LINDSAY APPOINTS CORRUPTION UNIT; Subpoena Power Asked for 2d Panel to Study Police – New York Times article: May 22, 1970
 Graft-Inquiry Head; Percy Whitman Knapp – New York Times article: May 23, 1970
 KNAPP SAYS LAWS SPUR POLICE GRAFT; Lindsay Appointee Explains Objectives of Inquiry – New York Times article: June 7, 1970
 41 Policemen Are Subpoenaed By Knapp Unit in Betting Inquiry- New York Times article: February 17, 1971
 PERJURY LAID TO 2 IN POLICE INQUIRY; Patrolmen in Meat Incident Are First to Be Accused in Knapp Investigation Perjury Charged to 2 Policemen In Knapp Inquiry on Corruption – New York Times article: June 9, 1971
 Knapp Says Mayor Shares Blame for Corrupt Police; Knapp Faults Lindsay On Corruption of Police – New York Times article: July 2, 1971
 KNAPP UNIT TELLS OF POLICE BRIBERY AS HEARINGS OPEN; Reports 'Extensive' Problem in Corruption Here--Tape Evidence Is Presented DETAILS OF VICE GRAFT 2 Patrolmen and a Lawyer Linked to Payoffs to Help an East Side Madam Knapp Panel Tells of Police Bribery as Hearings Begin Here – New York Times article: October 19, 1971
 Patrolman Says 'All But 2' Of Colleagues Got Bribes; Numbers Runner Tells the Knapp Panel That He Paid Off a Detective Monthly With Money From Social Security Patrolman Says 'All But 2' Colleagues Took Bribes – New York Times article: October 23, 1971
 KNAPP UNIT'S HEAD DEFENDS LEGALITY OF INVESTIGATION; Public Attention Is Essential in Combating Corruption, Lawyer Tells Critics HOGAN BACKS HEARINGS But Roberts Scores Actions -- Police Bid Businessmen End Giving of Gratuities Knapp Commission Chairman Defends Legality of Investigation – New York Times article: October 24, 1971
 Knapp Urges a Permanent Body on Police Corruption to Succeed His Panel – New York Times article: October 25, 1971
 Knapp Witness to Tell of Lindsay Officials' Apathy; Witness Will Tell Knapp Panel Lindsay Officials Ignored Graft – New York Times article: October 30, 1971
 Leary Agrees to Be Knapp Witness – New York Times article: December 14, 1971
 Serpico's Lonely Journey to Knapp Witness Stand – New York Times article: December 15, 1971
 The Knapp Commission Didn't Know It Couldn't Be Done; The Knapp Commission – New York Times article: January 9, 1972
 Phillips, a Knapp Witness, Indicted in Two Murders; Phillips, Knapp Witness, Is Indicted – New York Times article: March 21, 1972
 KNAPP NOMINATED AS FEDERAL JUDGE; Head of Police Inquiry Unit One of Four Named Here – New York Times article: June 16, 1972
 Knapp Panel's Recommendation a Touchy Problem for Mayor and Governor – New York Times article: August 27, 1972
 KNAPP PANEL SAYS WALSH AND OTHERS IGNORED TIPS BY U.S. ON POLICE CRIMES; KRIEGEL IS SCORED – New York Times article: December 28, 1972
 'SORT OF AN OLD GUY,' DEFINITIVELY A JUDGE; TURNING 90 DOES NOTHING TO TEMPER OPINIONS ISSUED BY WHITMAN KNAPP – New York Times article: February 24, 1999
 Hon. John F. Keenan, A MAN FOR ALL DECADES, Fordham Urban Law Journal, Vol. 26, pp. 1407–1410 (May 1999).

External links
 
 

People from Manhattan
Choate Rosemary Hall alumni
Yale University alumni
Harvard Law School alumni
American people of German descent
New York (state) lawyers
New York (state) state court judges
Judges of the United States District Court for the Southern District of New York
United States district court judges appointed by Richard Nixon
20th-century American judges
History of New York City
1909 births
2004 deaths
People associated with Cadwalader, Wickersham & Taft
Browning School alumni